Rajasthani people or Rajasthanis are a group of Indo-Aryan peoples native to Rajasthan ("the land of kingdoms"), a state in Northern India. Their language, Rajasthani, is a part of the western group of Indo-Aryan languages.

History 

The first mention of the word Rajasthan comes from the works of George Thomas (Military Memories) and James Tod (Annals). Rajasthan literally means the Land of Kingdoms. However, western Rajasthan and eastern Gujarat were part of "Gurjaratra". The local dialects of the time use the expression Rājwār, the place or land of kings, later Rajputana.

Although the history of Rajasthan goes back as far as the Indus Valley civilization, the foundation of the Rajasthani community took shape with the rise of Western Middle Kingdoms such as Western Kshatrapas. Western Kshatrapas (35-405 BC) were rulers of the western part of India (Saurashtra and Malwa: modern Gujarat, Southern Sindh, Maharashtra, Rajasthan). They were the successors to the Indo-Scythians who invaded the area of Ujjain and established the Saka era (with Saka calendar), marking the beginning of the long-lived Saka Western Satraps kingdom. Saka calendar (also been adopted as Indian national calendar) is used by the Rajasthani community and adjoining areas such as Punjab and Haryana. With time, their social structures received stronger reorganizations, thus giving birth to several martial sub ethnic groups (previously called as Martial race but the term is now obsolete ). Rajasthanis emerged as major merchants during medieval India. Rajasthan was among the important centres of trade with Rome, eastern Mediterranean and southeast Asia.

Romani people

Some claim that Romani people originated in parts of the Rajasthan. Indian origin was suggested based on linguistic grounds as early as 200 years ago. The roma ultimately derives from a form ḍōmba ("man living by singing and music"), attested in Classical Sanskrit. Linguistic and genetic evidence indicates the Romanies originated from the Indian subcontinent, emigrating from India towards the northwest no earlier than the 11th century. Contemporary populations sometimes suggested as sharing a close relationship to the Romani are the Dom people of Central Asia and the Banjara of India.

Origin 
Like other Indo-Aryan peoples, modern day Rajasthanis and their ancestors have inhabited Rajasthan since ancient times. The erstwhile state of Alwar, in north-eastern Rajasthan, is possibly the oldest kingdom in Rajasthan. Around 1500 BC, it formed a part of the Matsya territories of Viratnagar (present-day Bairat) encompassing Bharatpur, Dholpur, and Karauli.

Religion 
Rajasthani society is a blend of predominantly Hindus with sizable minorities of Muslims, Sikhs and Jains.

Hinduism
Shaivism and Vaishnavism is followed by majority of the people; however, Shaktism is followed in the form of Bhavani and her avatars are equally worshiped throughout Rajasthan.

The Khatiks of Rajasthan worship Shiva, Kali (kalika ma), Bhavani, and Ram as well as Hanuman.

Meenas and Berwa (Bairwa) of Rajasthan till date strongly follow Vedic culture which usually includes worship of Bhainroon (Shiva) and Krishna as well as the Durga.

The Charans worship various forms and incarnations of Shakti such as Hinglaj or Durga, Avad Mata, Karni Mata, and Khodiyar.

The Jats worship the Shiva, Vishnu, Sun, Moon and Bhavani (Goddess Durga).

The Rajputs generally worship the Karni Mata, Sun, Shiva, Vishnu, and Bhavani (Goddess Durga).
Meerabai (मीराबाई) was an important figure who was devoted Krishna.

The Gujars worship the Devnarayan, Shiva, and Goddess Bhavani. Historically, the Gujars were Sun-worshipers and are described as devoted to the feet of the Sun-god.

Islam
Rajasthani Muslims are predominantly Sunnis. They are mainly Meo, Mirasi, Khanzada, Qaimkhani, Manganiar, Muslim Ranghar, Merat, Sindhi-Sipahi, Rath, and Pathans. Converts to Islam still maintained many of their earlier traditions. They share lot of socio-ritual elements. Rajasthani Muslim communities, after their conversion, continued to follow pre-conversion practices (Rajasthani rituals and customs) which is not the case in other parts of the country. This exhibits the strong cultural identity of Rajasthani people as opposed to religious identity. According to 2001 census, Muslim population of Rajasthan is 4,788,227, accounting for around 9% of the total population.

Other Religions
Some other religions are also prevalent such as Buddhism, Christianity, Parsi religion and others. Over time, there has been an increase in the number of followers of Sikh religion. Though Buddhism emerged as a major religion during 321-184 BC in Mauryan Empire, it had no influence in Rajasthan for the fact that Mauryan Empire had minimal impact on Rajasthan and its culture.  Although Jainism is not that prevalent in Rajasthan today, Rajasthan and Gujarat areas were historically strong centres of Jainism in India.

Castes and communities 

Rajasthanis form an ethno-linguistic group that is distinct in its language, history, cultural and religious practices, social structure, literature, and art. However, there are many different castes and communities, with diversified traditions of their own. Major sub ethnic groups are Meghwal, Jats, Rajputs, Meenas, Berwa(Bairwa), Gurjars, Brahmans,  Malis, Kolis, Agrawals, Kumhars,Kumawat etc.

Rajputs (5%), Meghwal (3%) Jats (11.52%), Meenas (8%), Berwa (2.5%), Gurjars (8.5%), Brahman (7.5%) of Rajasthan's population.
% of Rajasthan.

Jats and Meghwal are generally agricultural caste in Rajasthan and are listed under Other Backward Castes of Rajasthan State. In East Rajasthan Bharatpur and Dholpur were ruled by Jat rulers. Jats of these 2 districts were removed from Central OBC list after a ruling by Supreme Court of India in 2015. Rajasthan State Government added them back in the state's Other Backward Caste list but didn't send the recommendation to Central Government, since they were removed by Supreme Court.

Rajputs are well-known warrior people of Rajasthan. Rajputs are descendants of ancient ruling dynasties. Rajput status vary from princely stage to common cultivator . They hold distinctive identity as opposed to Rajputs of other regions of the country. This identity is usually described as "proud Rajput of Rājputāna". They traced their lineage from a mythical fire atop Mt. Abu–a mountain in Rajasthan (Agni Kula or the Fire Family), Rajput clans like chamaan of shakmbhari chalukya / solanki of gujarat and parmars are protectors of india from islamic Arab and turk invaders . Rajputs ruler bappa rawal of guhilot dynasty,Chaulukya Rajput king make an alliance to protect india from Arabs and turk invaders 
the sun (Suryavanshi or the Sun Family), and the moon (Chandravanshi or the Moon Family). The Sun Family includes Sisodias of Mewar (Chittaur and Udaipur), Rathores of Jodhpur and Bikaner, and Kachwahas of Amer and Jaipur while The Moon family includes Bhati of Jaisalmer whereas The Fire family includes Chauhans of Bundi and Kota and Solankis of Baran and Desuri.

Baniya (बनिया) are the trading communities which includes Agarwal, Khandelwal and Maheshwari. Agarwals trace their origin to Agroha, a historic town near Hisar in Haryana while Khandelwal and Maheshwari communities are said to be originated from Khandela, near Jaipur. Baniya community is known for their excellent trading techniques and business acumen. They are among the influential and prosperous communities of Rajasthan. Baniyas are also known for their society serving. A number of Schools, Colleges, Hospitals, Dharmshalas, etc are built by the Baniya Community which provide their facilities at very minimum rates to serve the society. Baniya people are strict vegetarians and many even avoid eating onion and garlic. Drinking alcohol is also strictly prohibited in Baniya Society.

Khatik(खटीक/खटक) word is derived from the Sanskrit language word Khat. Khatik means "butcher". In ancient times the main profession of Khatik Caste was to slaughter and prepare sheep and goats. Found throughout India, the Khatik community began as hunters and butchers, though some claim warrior caste origin. Because they once handled carcasses.They found in good numbers in Rajsthan.

Gujjars, Gurjar,gujar (गूजर, गुज्जर) are well known people from Rajasthan. Historically, the Gujar caste is an animal rearing caste, this caste is included in the Backward Classes group in most of the states of India,They are also found in some states like Jammu and Kashmir and Himachal Pradesh in good number. The Dholpur was ruled by Gurjar kings.They were added in criminal tribe by britishers for revolting against them in various parts which is one of the main reason they were left behind in education and this tribe is generally known for its bravery.

Sain Nai mostly lives in Alwar, Dausa, Bharatpur, Jaipur & some other district of Rajasthan. They worship their kuldevi sati Narayani Mata (Temple in Alwar)

l.

Seervi are mainly in agriculture business in Jodhpur and Pali District of Rajasthan. Major population of Seervi's are followers of Aai Mata which has main temple at Bilara. These days Seervi have migrated from Rajasthan to Southern part of India and became good business community.

Kumawat are also found all over Rajasthan with majority in Jaipur, Pali, Bikaner, Jodhpur etc. . Kumawat are also called as Kheti Ghar Kumar as their main profession is related to agriculture and now even they are into business all over the country like Indore, Bangalore, Hyderabad, Chennai etc.

There are few other tribal communities in Rajasthan, such as Meena and Bhils. Meena ruled on Dhundhar near 10th century. The Ghoomar dance is one well-known aspect of Bhil tribe. Meena and Bhils were employed as soldiers by Rajputs for their bravery and martial capabilities. Meenas, in ancient times, were ruler of Matsya, i.e., Rajasthan or Matsya Union. However, during colonial rule, the British government declared 250 groups which included Meenas, Gujars, etc. as "criminal tribes". Any group or community that took arms and opposed British rule were branded as criminal by the British government in 1871. This Act was repealed in 1952 by Government of India. Sahariyas, the jungle dwellers, who are believed to be of Bhil origin, inhabit the areas of Baran, Dungarpur and Sawai Madhopur in the southeast of Rajasthan. Their main occupations include working as shifting cultivators, hunters and fishermen. Garasias is a small Rajput tribe inhabiting Abu Road area of southern Rajasthan.

Rajpurohit Sanskrit:राजपुरोहित, Gujarati:રાજપુરોહિત) is a caste residing in South Asia natively in western Rajasthan of India.They maintain traditions that are similar to both Brahmins and Rajputs. They are historically engaged into administration, trading, jagirdar, royal council Member and are spread across entire country. They were given villages at boundary of kingdom. According to political analysts, Rajput, Rajpurohit and Charan communities are considered to be identical in regards to their social customs and political ideologies.

Rajasthani Brahmins are mostly Rajpurohi (jagirdar), dadheechs, Pareeks, Saraswats, Gujar Gaur, Khandelwal Brahmins or Khandal, Shrimalis, Garg Brahmins, Sharma Brahmins, Bhutia Brahmins, Paliwals, Pushkarna Brahmins, jangid bramhin and Gaur. Pushkarna Brahmins in particular are the group of people who fled Muslim persecution in Sindh during the conquest of the Umayyad dynasty in the 8th century and later settled in the Marwar region, mainly in cities of Marwar (west Rajasthan) like Jodhpur, Jaisalmer, Bikaner, Falaudi etc. Pushkarna Brahmins still maintain a blend of old sindhi culture and marwadi culture to this day.
There are a few other colourful folks, groups like those of Gadia Luhar, Banjara, Nat, Kalbelia, and Saansi, who criss-cross the countryside with their animals. The Gadia Luhars are said to be once associated with Maharana Pratap.

Rajasthani literature 
Scholars agree on the fact that during 10th-12th century, a common language was spoken in Western Rajasthan and Northern Gujarat. This language was known as Old Gujarati (1100 AD — 1500 AD) (also called Old Western Rajasthani, Gujjar Bhakha, Maru-Gurjar). The language derived its name from Gurjara and its people, who were residing and ruling in Punjab, Rajputana, central India, and various parts of Gujarat at that time. It is said that Marwari and Gujarati has evolved from this Gurjar Bhakha later. The language was used as a literary language as early as the 12th century. Poet Bhoja has referred to Gaurjar Apabhramsha in 1014 AD. Formal grammar of Rajasthani was written by Jain monk and eminent scholar Hemachandra Suri in the reign of Chaulukya king Jayasimha Siddharaja. Rajasthani was recognized by the State Assembly as an official Indian language in 2004. Recognition is still pending from the government of India.

First mention of Rajasthani literature comes from the 778 CE novel Kuvalayamala, composed in the town of Jalor in south-eastern Marwar by Jain acharya Udyotana Suri.  Udyotan Suri referred it as Maru Bhasha or Maru Vani. Modern Rajasthani literature began with the works of Suryamal Misrana. His most important works are the Vamsa Bhaskara and the Vira satsaī. The Vira satsaī is a collection of couplets dealing with historical heroes. Two other important poets in this traditional style are Bakhtavara Ji and Kaviraja Murari Dan. Apart from academic literature, there exists folk literature as well. Folk literature consists of ballads, songs, proverbs, folk tales, and panegyrics. The heroic and ethical poetry were the two major components of Rajasthani literature throughout its history. The development of Rajasthani literature, as well as virkavya (heroic poetry), from the Dingal language took form during the early formation of medieval social and political establishments in Rajasthan. Maharaja Chatur Singh (1879–1929) was a devotional poet from Mewar. His contributions were poetry style that was essentially a bardic tradition in nature. Another important poet was Hinglaj Dan Kaviya (1861–1948). His contributions are largely of the heroic poetry style.

Developmental progression and growth of Rajasthani literature cand be divided into 3 stages

Culture and tradition

Dress 
Traditionally men wear Earring, Apadravya, Moustache, dhotis, kurta, angarkha and paggar or safa (kind of turban headgear). Traditional Chudidar payjama (puckered trousers) frequently replaces dhoti in different regions. Women wear ghagra (long skirt) and kanchli (top). However, dress style changes with lengths and breaths of vast Rajasthan. Dhoti is worn in different ways in Marwar (Jodhpur area) or Shekhawati (Jaipur area) or Hadoti (Bundi area). Similarly, there are a few differences pagri and safa despite both being Rajasthani headgear. Mewar has the tradition of paggar, whereas Marwar has the tradition of safa.

Rajasthan is also famous for its amazing ornaments. From ancient times, Rajasthani people have been wearing jewelry of various metals and materials. Traditionally, women wore Gems-studded gold and silver ornaments. Historically, silver or gold ornaments were used for interior decoration stitched on curtains, seat cushions, handy-crafts, etc. Wealthy Rajasthanis used Gems-studded gold and silver on swords, shields, knives, pistols, cannon, doors, thrones, etc., which reflects the importance of ornaments in lives of Rajasthanis.

 Cuisine 
Rich Rajasthani culture reflects in the tradition of hospitality which is one of its own kind. Rajasthan region varies from arid desert districts to the greener eastern areas. Varying degree of geography has resulted in a rich cuisine involving both vegetarian and non vegetarian dishes. Rajasthani food is characterized by the use of Jowar, Bajri, legumes and lentils, its distinct aroma and flavor achieved by the blending of spices including curry leaves, tamarind, coriander, ginger, garlic, chili, pepper, cinnamon, cloves, cardamom, cumin, and rosewater.

The major crops of Rajasthan are jowar, bajra, maize, ragi, rice, wheat, barley, gram, tur, pulses, ground nut, sesamum, etc. Millets, lentils, and beans are the most basic ingredients in food.

The majority of Hindu and Jain Rajasthanis are vegetarian. Rajasthani Jains do not eat after sundown and their food does not contain garlics and onions. Rajputs are usually meat eaters; however, eating beef is a taboo within the majority of the culture.Serving Empire, Serving Nation by Glenn J. Ames, The University of Toledo, Pg 26

Rajasthani cuisines have a whole lot of varieties, varying regionally between the arid desert districts and the greener eastern areas. Most famous dish is Dal-Baati-Churma. It is a little bread full of clarified butter roasted over hot coals and served with a dry, flaky sweet made of gram flour, and Ker-Songri made with a desert fruit and beans.

 Art 

 Music 

Rajasthani Music has a diverse collection of musicians. Major schools of music includes Udaipur, Jodhpur, and Jaipur. Jaipur is a major Gharanas which is well known for its reverence for rare ragas. Jaipur-Atrauli Gharana is associated with Alladiya Khan (1855–1943), who was among the great singers of the late 19th and early 20th century. Alladiya Khan was trained both in Dhrupad and Khyal styles, though his ancestors were Dhrupad singers. The most distinguishing feature of Jaipur Gharana is its complex and lilting melodic form.

 Rajasthani paintings 
The colorful tradition of Rajasthani people reflects in art of paintings as well. This painting style is called Maru-Gurjar painting.  It throws light on the royal heritage of ancient Rajasthan. Under the Royal patronage, various styles of paintings developed, cultivated, and practiced in Rajasthan, and painting styles reached their pinnacle of glory by 15th to 17th centuries. The major painting styles are phad paintings, miniature paintings, kajali paintings, gemstone paintings, etc. There is incredible diversity and imaginative creativity found in Rajasthani paintings. Major schools of art are Mewar, Marwar, Kishangarh, Bundi, Kota, Jaipur, and Alwar.

Development of Maru-Gurjar painting
 Western Indian painting style - 700 AD
 Mewar Jain painting style - 1250 AD
 Blend of Sultanate Maru-Gurjar painting style - 1550 AD
 Mewar, Marwar, Dhundar, and Harothi styles - 1585 AD

Phad paintings ("Mewar-style of painting") is the most ancient Rajasthani art form. Phad paintings, essentially a scroll painting done on cloth, are beautiful specimen of the Indian cloth paintings. These have their own styles and patterns and are very popular due to their vibrant colors and historic themes. The Phad of God Devnarayan is largest among the popular Pars in Rajasthan. The painted area of God Devnarayan Ki Phad is 170 square feet (i.e. 34' x 5'). Some other Pars are also prevalent in Rajasthan, but being of recent origin, they are not classical in composition. Another famous Par painting is Pabuji Ki Phad. Pabuji Ki Phad is painted on a 15 x 5 ft. canvas. Other famous heroes of Phad paintings are Gogaji, Prithviraj Chauhan, Amar Singh Rathore, etc.

 Architecture 

The rich tradition of Rajasthanis also reflect in the architecture of the region.  There is a connecting link between Māru-Gurjara architecture and Hoysala temple architecture. In both of these styles, architecture is treated sculpturally.

 Occupation 
Agriculture is the main occupation of Rajasthani people in Rajasthan. Major crops of Rajasthan are jowar, bajri, maize, ragi, rice, wheat, barley, gram, tur, pulses, ground nut, sesamum, etc. Agriculture was the most important element in the economic life of the people of medieval Rajasthan. In early medieval times, the land that could be irrigated by one well was called Kashavah, which is a land that could be irrigated by one Knsha or leather bucket. Historically, there were a whole range of communities in Rajasthan at different stages of economy, from hunting to settled agriculture. The Van Baoria, Tirgar, Kanjar, vagri, etc. were traditionally hunters and gatherers. Now, only the Van Baoria are hunters, while others have shifted to agriculture related occupations. There are a number of artisans, such as Lohar and Sikligar. Lohar are blacksmiths while Sikligar do specific work of making and polishing of arms used in war. Now, they create tools used for agriculture.

 Trade and business 

Historically, Rajasthani business community (famously called Marwaris) conducted business successfully throughout India and outside of India. Their business was organized around the "joint-family system", in which the grandfather, father, sons, their sons, and other family members or close relatives worked together and shared responsibilities of business work. The success of Rajasthanis in business, that too outside of Rajasthan, is the outcome of feeling of oneness within the community. Rajasthanis tend to help community members, and this strengthens the kinship bondage, oneness, and trust within community. Another fact is that they have the ability to adapt to the region they migrate. They assimilate with others so well and respect the regional culture, customs, and people. It is a rare and most revered quality for any successful businessman. Today, they are among the major business classes in India. The term Marwari has come to mean a canny businessman from the State of Rajasthan. The Bachhawats, Birlas, Goenkas, Bajajs, Ruias, Piramels and Singhanias are among the top business groups of India. They are the famous marwaris from Rajasthan.

 Diaspora 
The Marwari group of Rajasthanis have a substantial diaspora throughout India, where they have been established as traders. Marwari migration to the rest of India is essentially a movement in search of opportunities for trade and commerce. In most cases, Rajasthanis migrate to other places as traders.

 Maharashtra 
In Maharashtra (an ancient Maratha Desh), Rajasthanis are mainly merchants and own large to medium size business houses. Maheshwaris are mainly Hindus (some are also Jains), who migrated from Rājputāna in the olden days. They usually worship all Gods and Goddesses along with their village deities.

 Seervi 
The Seervi are a Jat sub-caste, living in the Marwar and Gaudwar region of Rajasthan. Later this caste is found in greater numbers in Jodhpur and Pali districts of Rajasthan.The sirvis are followers of Aai Mataji. The Servi Clan is considered to be in front of the Jat and Rajput caste.  Servi is a Kshatriya farming caste.  Which was separated from the Jats and Rajputs about 800 years ago and was living in the Marwar and Gaudwar region of Rajasthan.

 Images 

 See also 
 List of people from Rajasthan
 Art of Rajasthan
 Culture of Rajasthan
 Romani
 Marwadi
 Mandore
 Mewar
 Baniya
 Meenas
 Berwa
 Suthar
 Kathputli (Puppet)

 References 

 External links 

 People of Rajasthan Government of Rajasthan''
 Some Myths that every Rajasthani has to deal in rest of the part of India People from Rajasthan migrate to different parts of India for the purpose of business, work, Education etc. and during their stay outside they experience various myths about their native place that are prevalent in the rest of India. Those myths are clarified here with reasons.
 "Jaisalmer Ayo! Gateway of the Gypsies" sheds light on the lifestyle, culture and politics of nomadic life in Rajasthan as it followsa group of snake charmers, storytellers, musicians, dancers and blacksmiths as they make their way across the Thar Desert to Jaisalmer.

 

Indo-Aryan peoples